Isola is a station on Line 5 of the Milan Metro. It takes its name from the Isola (island) district of Milan in which it is located, its name derived from the neighbourhood's position cut off from the city centre by the main railway.

History 
The works for the construction of the first section of Line 5, which includes Isola station, began in September 2007, and it was opened on 1 March 2014 as part of the extension to Garibaldi FS.

Station structure 
Isola is an underground station with two tracks in one tunnel and, like all the other stations on Line 5, is wheelchair accessible.
 
It is located on Via Volturno, at the intersection with Via Sebenico, and has exits only to Via Volturno.

Interchanges 
Near this station are located:
  Tram stop (Piazzale Lagosta, lines 7 and 33)
  Bus stop

References

Line 5 (Milan Metro) stations
Railway stations opened in 2013
2013 establishments in Italy
Railway stations in Italy opened in the 21st century